Lluís or Luis de Requesens may refer to:

 Lluís de Requesens (commander), Catalan-Aragonese naval commander
 Luis de Requesens y Relat (died 1469), Catalan baron of Altafulla and La Nou de Gaià
 Luis de Requesens y Zúñiga (1528–1576), Spanish general, sailor, diplomat and politician